The AristoMedia Group is a Nashville-based, independent entertainment marketing/media/promotion firm representing country music artists and industry clients.  The company was founded in 1980 by former Con Brio Records Vice President, Jeff Walker.  Primary services The AristoMedia Group provides include: Christian and Country video promotion, secondary radio promotion, dance club venue marketing and promotion, new media services, entertainment publicity and video content/EPK distribution.

The AristoMedia Group is comprised specifically of the following branded divisions and services: Aristo PR (publicity), AristoVision (Christian video promotion), AristoVideo (Country video promotion), AristoWorks (new media services), The Goodland Group (video reel distribution), Jeff Walker & Associates (international and domestic entertainment consultation), Marco Music Group (secondary radio promotion), Marco Club Connection (dance club venue marketing), The Goodland Group (music publishing) and DownCast (video content and EPK distribution service).

Overview
 1980 Aristo Music Associates formed, initially as publicity and PR firm
 1984 Expanded to include Country music video promotion department (AristoVideo)
 1989 Branding changed to AristoMedia; expanded into Christian market by offering Christian music video promotion services
 1991 Established the Marco Music Group and its promotion division, Marco Promotions (secondary radio promotion)
 1994 Formed The Goodland Group, a division of AristoMedia
 1995 Formed Jeff Walker & Associates
 2003 Re-launched Walkerbout Music, the publishing arm of The AristoMedia Group
 2004 Established Marco Club Connection, the dance venue promotion division of Marco Promotions 
 2005 Created and hosted the first Aristo Global Showcase, an international artist showcase held each year during CMA Music Festival week in downtown Nashville, Tenn.
 2006 Launched AristoWorks (new media), branded Christian video services division as AristoVision
 2007 Launch of GMV Nashville, an online record label offering digital downloads of classic and contemporary Country artists.
 2009 In partnership with Travis Television Productions, co-developed the DownCast service, a video content and electronic press kit distribution service.
 2013 Expanded JWA into international project management

References

External links
 
 
 
 
  
 

Public relations companies of the United States
Privately held companies based in Tennessee